The Taconic unconformity is a major unconformity created during the Taconic orogeny, exposed from eastern New York State to the Gaspe peninsula.  The orogeny was a long one that comprised multiple bursts; it primarily dated to the end of the Ordovician, and the underlying rocks are primarily this age.  It is overlain by Silurian and Devonian metasediments.

References 

Unconformities
Ordovician events
Ordovician geology of New York (state)
Tourist attractions in New York (state)